Royal Secret Agent is a South Korean historical comedy, detective television series. The series is directed by Kim Jung-min and stars Kim Myung-soo, Kwon Nara, Lee Tae-hwan, Lee Yi-kyung, and Jo Soo-min. Written by Kang Min-sun and Park Sung-hoon the series is about a government position in Joseon dynasty known as Secret royal inspector, who monitors corrupt government officials while remaining undercover. It aired on KBS2 every Monday and Tuesday at 21:30 (KST) from December 21, 2020 to February 9, 2021.

Synopsis
Set in the era of Joseon dynasty the series revolves around  Sung Yi-gyum (Kim Myung-soo), a state examination top scorer who works in the administrative and research department of the government office. He is caught gambling and as punishment, he is re-assigned to a new position as a secret royal inspector to investigate the corrupt practices of public officers. Yi-gyum carries out his new job with the help of Hong Da-in (Kwon Nara), a female inspector, and Park Chun-sam (Lee Yi-kyung), his talkative but affectionate servant.

Cast

Main

The three musketeers
 Kim Myung-soo as Sung Yi-gyum, a secret royal inspector
 Kwon Na-ra as Hong Da-in/Honglang/Lee Young-sin, female police posing as a courtesan whose beauty is comparable to Hwang Jini. She becomes a member of Royal Secret Agent's entourage.
 Lee Yi-kyung as Park Chun-sam, Sung Yi-gyum's servant.

Around three musketeers
 Lee Tae-hwan as Sung Yi-beom, Sung Yi-gyum's half-brother, head of the band of vigilante 
 Jo Soo-min as Kang Soon-ae, Sung Yi-gyum's ex-lover, daughter of a courtesan

Supporting
 Ahn Nae-sang as Jang Tae-seung, Chief Royal Secretary
 Son Byong-ho as Kim Byeong-geun, Chief State Councillor
 Kim Young-cheol
 Choi Jong-won as Kang In-chung, corrupt sheriff
 Shin Ha-young as Kim Mi-ok
 Park Joo-hyung as Seo Yong
 Kim Kyung-sook
 Lee Min-woo
 Um Hyo-sup
 Chae Dong-hyun as Kim Man-hee, Kim Byeong-geun's first son
 Jong Ho as Man Deok
 Shin Ji-hoon as Choi Do-kwan
 Jo Deok-hee as Jung Moon-ho
 Yang Byung-yeol as Civil servant Kim

Production
By July 2020 the main cast of the series with Lee Tae-hwan, Kim Myung-soo, Kwon Nara and Lee Yi-kyung was finalized. The broadcast was initially scheduled to be premiered on November 2, 2020, but due to re-proliferation of COVID-19, the production was delayed. In October group script reading was held. The still photos in the period costume, from the set of series were released by KBS as the filming progressed.

Original soundtrack

Part 1

Part 2

Part 3

Episodes

Viewership
As per the audience rating of AGB Nielsen Media Research, the second part of the final episode, recorded 14% average TV viewership ratings. This is the record for its own highest ratings.

Notes

International broadcast
The series is available same time as Korea, as an iQIYI Original and exclusively on iQIYI globally (except China and Korea) with multi-languages subtitles.
It is also available non-exclusively on iQIYI in South Korea.

Awards and nominations

References

External links
  
 Royal Secret Agent at Daum 
 
 
 

Korean Broadcasting System television dramas
Korean-language television shows
2020 South Korean television series debuts
2021 South Korean television series endings
Alternate history television series
Television series set in the Joseon dynasty
South Korean historical television series
South Korean comedy television series
Television series by IWill Media
Television productions suspended due to the COVID-19 pandemic